is the name of multiple train stations in Japan.

Ōkubo Station (Akita) - in Katagami, Akita Prefecture
Ōkubo Station (Hyogo) - in Akashi, Hyōgo Prefecture
Ōkubo Station (Kyoto) - in Uji, Kyoto Prefecture
Ōkubo Station (Tokyo) - in Shinjuku, Tokyo
Shin-Ōkubo Station - in Shinjuku, Tokyo
Keisei-Ōkubo Station - in Narashino, Chiba Prefecture
Kazusa-Ōkubo Station - in Ichihara, Chiba Prefecture